Calle luna, Calle sol (English title: World's Apart) is a Venezuelan telenovela developed by José Vicente Quintana and produced by RCTV in 2009 as a free adaptation of the telenovela Marielena that was produced by the same channel in 1979.

Monica Spear and Manuel Sosa star as the main protagonists with Amanda Gutiérrez and Nacho Huett as antagonists, accompanied by the stellar performances of Chantal Baudaux, Daniel Alvarado and Nacarid Escalona.

RCTV began transmitting Calle Luna, Calle Sol from March 18, 2009 at 9 pm replacing Nadie me dirá como quererte. The last episode was broadcast on September 14, 2009.

Plot
Calle Luna, Calle Sol is a telenovela contrasting folk and urban culture. It shows two completely different realities: that of the rich and the poor, and what differentiates the two groups. In both neighborhoods, major developments speak for themselves and their realities are moved each of the characters. In the story, Maria Esperanza is a young, humble, studious, and hardworking young woman who has suffered from poverty due to the irresponsibility of her father, who comes and goes from her house. Even in the midst of these circumstances, she grew up with strong values, dedicated to making something of herself. However, her plans could be disrupted by her emotional struggles. Despite this turmoil, Maria Esperanza will fight to keep the love of his family and overcome her emotional trials and tribulations.

The story began four years after the embarrassing incident that happened to Maria Esperanza, after which Manuel returned to England to study administration. Manuel then comes back in order to take over the family business, Furniture Mastronardi, while building a relationship with Gabriela, who would be his lifelong girlfriend. The tragic past of Maria Esperanza knows when to remove Manuel Augusto, who represents the renewal of their broken dreams, because they arise from a sincere love, full of hopes.

Cast

Starring 
 Monica Spear as María Esperanza Rodríguez
 Manuel Sosa as Manuel Augusto Mastronardi García
 Chantal Baudaux as Gabriela "Gaby" Bustamante

Also starring 

 Amanda Gutiérrez as Cecilia García Vda. de Mastronardi
 Nacarid Escalona as Isabel "Chabela" Rodríguez
 Daniel Alvarado as Juan José Pérez "Juancho"
 Estefanía López as Yamileth Melody Rodríguez 
 Nacho Huett as Rafael Eduardo Mastronardi García "Rafa"
 José Ramón Barreto as José Francisco Rodríguez Rodríguez "Cheo"
 Vicente Tepedino as Rómulo Hidalgo
 María Cristina Lozada as Ángela Rossi Vda. de Mastronardi
 Crisbel Henríquez as Bélgica Margarita Pacheco
 Erick Ronsó as Alfredo Pineda
 Sandy Olivares as César Ayala Infante
 Andreína Caro as Alexandra Valecillos
 Absalón de los Ríos as Aldo Luján "El Jefe"
 Relú Cardozo as Lourdes de Pineda
 Vito Lonardo as Mario de Jesús Pineda
 Mauricio Gómez as Johanson Iriarte "Chupeta"
 José Roberto Díaz as Custodio Chacón
 Elvis Chaveinte as Ricardo Sánchez "El Mexicano"
 Jean Carlos Rodríguez as Enrique Vallejo "Kike"
 Vanessa Pallás as Yoconda Mastronardi García "Monalisa"
 Gabriel Mantilla as Carlos Rodríguez Rodríguez "Carlitos"
 Lili-Anahys Taravella as Camila Díaz
 Cristal Avilera as Valentina Díaz
 Andreína Chataing as Elvira Lugo
 Sandra Díaz as Valerie Hidalgo Arriaga
 Antonio Cuevas as Giuseppe Mastronardi
 Leonardo Marrero as Ignacio Centeno
 Krisbell Jackson as La condolesa

References

External links

Opening credits

2009 telenovelas
2009 Venezuelan television series debuts
2009 Venezuelan television series endings
Venezuelan telenovelas
RCTV telenovelas
Spanish-language telenovelas
Television shows set in Caracas